Pencak silat competition at the 2016 Asian Beach Games was held in Danang, Vietnam from 27 September to 1 October 2016 at Bien Dong park, Danang, Vietnam.

Medalists

Men's seni

Men's tanding

Women's seni

Women's tanding

Medal table

Results

Men's seni

Tunggal
27 September

Ganda
27 September

Regu
28 September

Men's tanding

50 kg

55 kg

60 kg

65 kg

70 kg

75 kg

80 kg

85 kg

Women's seni

Tunggal
27 September

Ganda
27 September

Regu
28 September

Women's tanding

50 kg

55 kg

60 kg

65 kg

References

External links 
Official website

2016 Asian Beach Games events